Albert Boonstra (born 22 May 1957) is a retired swimmer from the Netherlands. He competed at the 1980 Summer Olympics in the 100 m and 200 m breaststroke and 4 × 100 m medley relay and finished seventh in the relay.

References

1957 births
Living people
Dutch male breaststroke swimmers
Olympic swimmers of the Netherlands
Swimmers at the 1980 Summer Olympics
Sportspeople from Nijmegen